The NLT Study Bible was released in September, 2008, by Tyndale House Publishers, Inc. following a decade long process from original conception to publication. A Genesis "sampler" was released in April of the same year. Featuring a brand new set of notes and features put together by what Tyndale calls "a dream team of today's top Bible scholars", the NLT Study Bible "focuses on the meaning and message of the text as understood in and through the original historical context." In print form, the NLT Study Bible contains 2528 pages of material. It is also available in electronic form on multiple software platforms.

Features 
Translation--The Bible text is the New Living Translation, second edition (copyright 2007)
Word Study System--Certain major Hebrew or Greek words are transliterated within the reference column along with its Tyndale-Strong’s number. A reader can look these words up in the “Dictionary and Index for Hebrew and Greek Key Word Studies” in the back of the NLTSB.
Section Introductions--Overviews of major sections of Scripture.
Book Introductions--Solid introductions provide setting, outline, chronological summary and discussions of authorship, language and sources, and meaning and message.
Theme Notes--Short articles that develop the main themes and topics contained in each book of the Bible.
Running Outlines--Contained within the biblical text following the literary structure of the book
Parallel Passage Notations--A comprehensive system of noting parallel passages follows immediately after the pertinent running outlines. E.g., at Jer. 39:1 (running outline: The Fall of Jerusalem) the parallel passage notation reads: Jer 39:1-10 // Jer 52:3b-16 // 2 kg 24:20b-25:12
Further Reading--Section and book introductions contain lists of sources of further reading including Christian and Jewish scholars from a variety of backgrounds.
Person Profiles--Short articles that give focus to significant figures in the Bible
Study Notes--Answering the "so what?" about biblical facts, these notes are designed to give the meaning and message of Scripture to engage the reader and offer better understanding of the text.
Cross-References--The NLT Study Bible reinvents the cross reference column making it much more useful than merely offering other verses to look up. In addition to what one would expect of any cross reference system, parallel passages are indicated by two double forward slash marks (//). Asterisks mark intertestamental quotations.
Detailed Charts, Interior Maps, Illustrations, Diagrams and Timelines--A variety of information remains constantly at the fingertips of readers as they explore the Bible.

Online Version 
Coinciding with the release of the NLT Study Bible, an interactive website was launched offering a complete online version of the NLT Study Bible. A user code is provided with each copy of the Bible sold so that the owner may have access to any of the study Bible's features, even when the physical copy is not present. In addition to the online version, the NLT Study Bible website features background information about the NLT Study Bible as well as a regularly updated blog in which readers can interact with editors and contributors of the NLT Study Bible.

Editions 
The NLT Study Bible is available in hardback, bonded leather, and "LeatherLike" bindings. It is also available electronically for the Libronix Digital Library System and WORDsearch platforms as well as a pocket edition from Laridian. A Kindle edition is coming soon.

References

External links 
NLT Study Bible website
NLT Study Bible Blog
A Review of the NLT Study Bible in Bible Study Magazine

Study Bibles
Bible translations into English
2008 non-fiction books
2008 in Christianity